The 2023 Castilian-Manchegan regional election will be held on Sunday, 28 May 2023, to elect the 11th Cortes of the autonomous community of Castilla–La Mancha. All 33 seats in the Cortes will be up for election. The election will be held simultaneously with regional elections in eleven other autonomous communities and local elections all throughout Spain.

Overview

Electoral system
The Cortes of Castilla–La Mancha are the devolved, unicameral legislature of the autonomous community of Castilla–La Mancha, having legislative power in regional matters as defined by the Spanish Constitution and the Castilian-Manchegan Statute of Autonomy, as well as the ability to vote confidence in or withdraw it from a regional president.

Voting for the Cortes is on the basis of universal suffrage, which comprises all nationals over 18 years of age, registered in Castilla–La Mancha and in full enjoyment of their political rights. Additionally, Castilian-Manchegan people abroad are required to apply for voting before being permitted to vote, a system known as "begged" or expat vote. The 33 members of the Cortes of Castilla–La Mancha are elected using the D'Hondt method and a closed list proportional representation, with an electoral threshold of three percent of valid votes—which includes blank ballots—being applied in each constituency. Seats are allocated to constituencies, corresponding to the provinces of Albacete, Ciudad Real, Cuenca, Guadalajara and Toledo, with each being allocated an initial minimum of three seats and the remaining 18 being distributed in proportion to their populations.

The use of the D'Hondt method may result in a higher effective threshold, depending on the district magnitude.

Election date
The term of the Cortes of Castilla–La Mancha expires four years after the date of their previous election. Elections to the Cortes are fixed for the fourth Sunday of May every four years. The previous election was held on 26 May 2019, setting the election date for the Cortes on Sunday, 28 May 2023.

The president has the prerogative to dissolve the Cortes of Castilla–La Mancha and call a snap election, provided that no motion of no confidence is in process, no nationwide election is due and some time requirements are met: namely, that dissolution does not occur either during the first legislative session or within the legislature's last year ahead of its scheduled expiry, nor before one year has elapsed since a previous dissolution. Any snap election held as a result of these circumstances will not alter the period to the next ordinary election, with elected deputies merely serving out what remains of their four-year terms. In the event of an investiture process failing to elect a regional president within a two-month period from the first ballot, the candidate from the party with the highest number of seats is to be deemed automatically elected.

Parliamentary composition
The table below shows the composition of the parliamentary groups in the Cortes at the present time.

Parties and candidates
The electoral law allows for parties and federations registered in the interior ministry, coalitions and groupings of electors to present lists of candidates. Parties and federations intending to form a coalition ahead of an election are required to inform the relevant Electoral Commission within ten days of the election call, whereas groupings of electors need to secure the signature of at least one percent of the electorate in the constituencies for which they seek election, disallowing electors from signing for more than one list of candidates.

Below is a list of the main parties and electoral alliances which will likely contest the election:

Opinion polls
The tables below list opinion polling results in reverse chronological order, showing the most recent first and using the dates when the survey fieldwork was done, as opposed to the date of publication. Where the fieldwork dates are unknown, the date of publication is given instead. The highest percentage figure in each polling survey is displayed with its background shaded in the leading party's colour. If a tie ensues, this is applied to the figures with the highest percentages. The "Lead" column on the right shows the percentage-point difference between the parties with the highest percentages in a poll.

Graphical summary

Voting intention estimates
The table below lists weighted voting intention estimates. Refusals are generally excluded from the party vote percentages, while question wording and the treatment of "don't know" responses and those not intending to vote may vary between polling organisations. When available, seat projections determined by the polling organisations are displayed below (or in place of) the percentages in a smaller font; 17 seats are required for an absolute majority in the Cortes of Castilla–La Mancha.

Voting preferences
The table below lists raw, unweighted voting preferences.

Victory likelihood
The table below lists opinion polling on the perceived likelihood of victory for each party in the event of a regional election taking place.

Preferred President
The table below lists opinion polling on leader preferences to become president of the Junta of Communities of Castilla–La Mancha.

Results

Overall

Notes

References
Opinion poll sources

Other

Castilla-La Mancha
Castilla-La Mancha
2020s